The Notting Hill Mystery (1862–1863) is an English-language detective novel written under the pseudonym Charles Felix, with illustrations by George du Maurier. The author's identity was never revealed, but several critics have suggested posthumously Charles Warren Adams (1833–1903), a lawyer known to have written other novels under pseudonyms. It is seen as one of the first detective novels in the English language, if not the first.

History
The Notting Hill Mystery first appeared as an eight-part serial in Once A Week magazine beginning on 29 November 1862, then as a single-volume novel in 1865 published by Saunders, Otley, and Company, with illustrations by George du Maurier (grandfather of Daphne du Maurier).

The magazine editors stated that the manuscript was submitted to them under the pseudonym "Charles Felix". In 1952, William Buckler identified Charles Warren Adams (1833–1903) as the author of The Notting Hill Mystery and in January 2011, Paul Collins, a writer, editor and academic, writing in The New York Times Book Review, came to the same conclusion. Adams, a lawyer, was the sole proprietor of Saunders, Otley & Co., which published another book by "Charles Felix" called Velvet Lawn, and an edition of The Notting Hill Mystery in 1865. Collins bases his theory on several lines of evidence, including a reference to Felix's identity as Adams in a 14 May 1864 "Literary Gossip" column of The Manchester Times: "It is understood that Velvet Lawn, by Charles Felix, the new novel announced by Messrs. Saunders, Otley & Co., is by Mr. Charles Warren Adams, now the sole representative of that firm."

Some critics – including Julian Symons, a crime writer and poet – believe it to be the first modern detective novel, though it was later overshadowed by works by Wilkie Collins and Émile Gaboriau, which usually receive that accolade. Some aspects of detective fiction can also be found in R. D. Blackmore's sensation novel Clara Vaughan (written in 1853, published in 1864), about the daughter of a murder victim seeking her father's killer, but Adams's novel contains several innovations, such as the main character presenting evidence of his own findings through diary entries, family letters, depositions, chemical analysts report and crime scene map. These techniques would not become common until the 1920s. Symons said it "quite bowled me over" how far ahead of its time it was.

Plot
Source documents compiled by insurance investigator Ralph Henderson are used to build a case against Baron "R___", who is suspected of murdering his wife. The baron's wife died from drinking a bottle of acid, apparently while sleepwalking in her husband's private laboratory. Henderson's suspicions are raised when he learns that the baron recently had purchased five life insurance policies for his wife. As Henderson investigates the case, he discovers not one but three murders. The plot hinges on the dangers of mesmerism, a subject explored in fiction earlier by Isabella Frances Romer. Although the baron's guilt is clear to the reader even from the outset, how he did it remains a mystery. Eventually this is revealed, but how to catch him becomes the final challenge; he seems to have committed the perfect crime.

Editions
The novel was reprinted in 1945 by Pilot Press Ltd. of London in its anthology Novels of Mystery from the Victorian Age. In March 2011 the British Library made the novel available again via print-on-demand. It sold so many copies they were prompted to make a trade edition, produced using photographs of the 1865 edition. This was published in 2012 on the 150th anniversary of the novel's release. An ebook version is also available.

See also
1862 in literature
1863 in literature

References

.

External links
The Notting Hill Mystery, Project Gutenberg
The Notting Hill Mystery, serialized in Once a Week (original edition illustrated, at Internet Archive):
Section 1 (Once a Week, Vol. 7, p. 617, 29 November 1862)
Section 2 (Once a Week, Vol. 7, p. 645, 6 December 1862)
Section 3 (Once a Week, Vol. 7, p. 673, 13 December 1862)
Section 4 (Once a Week, Vol. 7, p. 701, 20 December 1862)
Section 5 (Once a Week, Vol. 8, p. 1, 27 December 1862)
Section 6 (Once a Week, Vol. 8, p. 29, 3 January 1863)
Section 7 (Once a Week, Vol. 8, p. 57, 10 January 1863)
Section 8 (Once a Week, Vol. 8, p. 85, 17 January 1863)
Lewis, Steve (19 December 2010). Norris, J.F. (19 December 2010).  "Reviewed by J. F. Norris: Charles Felix – The Notting Hill Mystery".  Mystery File (blog at mysteryfile.com).  Retrieved 10 January 2011.

1863 British novels
British detective novels
Novels first published in serial form
Novels set in London
Works originally published in Once a Week (magazine)
Works published under a pseudonym
Uxoricide in fiction